Chinaglia is a surname. Notable people with the surname include:

 Arlindo Chinaglia (born 1949), Brazilian politician
 Giorgio Chinaglia (1947–2012), Italian football striker